Bugti is a Baloch tribe found in eastern Balochistan, Pakistan. , it was estimated to comprise over 180,000 people, mostly living in the Dera Bugti region of Pakistan. They are in turn divided into the Rahija, Marhita, Nothani, Perozani, Masori, Mondarani and Kalpar sub-tribes. Their neighbours to the north are the Marri, who were the Bugti's traditional enemies.

See also
 Marri-Bugti Country
 Bhagnari

References

Baloch tribes